Nataliya Petrivna Gumenyuk (alternate Romanization: Natalia Humeniuk; born 1983) is a Ukrainian journalist who specializes in foreign affairs and conflict reporting, and an author of three books. She is the founder of the Public Interest Journalism Lab; as well as the co-founder and chair of the public television NGO Hromadske.

Early life and education
Nataliya Petrivna Gumenyuk was born in Birobidzhan in 1983. She graduated with a bachelor's degree from the Institute of Journalism of Taras Shevchenko National University of Kyiv (Kyiv National University; KNU) (2000–2004 or 2001–2005). She earned a master's degree in international journalism from Örebro University, Sweden (2005–2006).

Career
Gumenyuk took the course "International Media Systems" at the Mohyla School of Journalism in Kyiv. From 2002 to 2004, she was the editor-in-chief of the independent student newspaper Nasha Sprava. In 2002–2003, she was an international journalist on Novyi Kanal. Also in 2003, she was an international journalist for 5 Kanal. In 2003–2004, she was an international journalist for the fact-check program ICTV. In 2004, she worked for the "ProfiTV News Agency". In 2005–2007, she was the head of the international department, a special correspondent for the "K1" TV channel and the author and host of the "One Reportage" program.

From 2007 to the end of 2009, she headed the international department of the INTER TV channel and also served as a special correspondent. Towards the end of this period, in 2009, for the first time among Ukrainian TV channels, INTER was nominated for an Emmy Award in the News category for its coverage of the South Ossetian War (reporter Ruslan Yarmolyuk). In 2009, Gumenyuk also did an internship at BBC World News on HARDtalk and at The Guardian and The Independent.

At the end of 2009, she was fired from the INTER TV channel without explanation. This caused a wave of outrage among her colleagues, who collected more than 70 signatures against her release. After that, some journalists resigned of their own free will (including Roman Vintonov). Afterwards, she did not get a job in other media and became a freelancer.

In 2010–2011, Gumenyuk was the editor-in-chief of the project "Our" (INTER, studio "07 Production") whose focus was on fifteen TV programs about Ukrainians who left Ukraine for various reasons and became successful abroad, including in Norway, Brazil, South Africa, India, China, among others. Gumenyuk took part in the search for sponsors of the project. After that, she covered the events of the Arab Spring at her own expense. She worked as an international freelancer mainly for Ukrainian publications, such as The Ukrainian Week, Ukrayinska Pravda, Esquire Ukraine, studio 1 + 1, radio Voice of the Capital, as well as for some foreign media, such as OpenDemocracy Russia (UK), RTL-Netherlands, and M6 (France). 

In 2013, she became one of the initiators for the creation of the digital broadcasting TV station Hromadske, and was elected its head in May 2015.

Since November 6, 2019, Gumenyuk has been a member of the Council for Freedom of Speech and Protection of Journalists.

Personal life
In Minsk, on August 12, 2017, she married Peter Ruzavin, a journalist with the Russian TV channel Dozhd.

Awards
 2009 – Laureate of the Anatoliy Moskalenko Foundation for the Development of Journalism for achievements in journalism.
 2013 – Silver medal in the competition of artistic reporting "Samovydets" (for the report "How the desert sounds where the water begins", a collection of emotional notes from Jordan, Egypt, Iran, Tunisia).

Selected works

Books
 Veni, Vidi, Scripsi: Світ у масштабі українського репортажу (Veni, Vidi, Scripsi: The World on the Scale of Ukrainian Reporting) (collection of reports by various authors), Kyiv: Tempora, 2013.
 Майдан Тахрір. У пошуках втраченої революції (Tahrir Square. In search of the lost revolution.), Kyiv: Political Criticism, 2015.
 Загублений острів. Книга репортажів з окупованого Криму (Lost island. Book of reports from the occupied Crimea.), Lviv: Old Lion Publishing House, 2020.

References

External links
 Author's page at Tyzhden.ua (in Ukrainian)
 Наталя Гуменюк: Я не претендувала написати енциклопедію арабського світу (Natalia Humeniuk: I did not claim to write an encyclopedia of the Arab world) at chytomo.com (in Ukrainian)

1983 births
Living people
21st-century Ukrainian journalists
21st-century Ukrainian women writers
Ukrainian women journalists
People from Birobidzhan
Taras Shevchenko National University of Kyiv alumni
Örebro University alumni